The "Lac La Flippe" is a body of fresh water located in the territory of the town of Baie-Saint-Paul, in the Charlevoix Regional County Municipality, in the administrative region of Capitale-Nationale, in the province of Quebec, in Canada .

Lac La Flippe constitutes the head water of the Bras du Nord-Ouest. This lake embedded between two mountains is entirely located in an area where forestry has always been the predominant economic activity. In the middle of the 19th century, recreational tourism activities took off. This lake is normally frozen from the beginning of December until the beginning of April; however, safe circulation on the ice is generally done from mid-December to the end of March.

Secondary forest roads connected to the east at route 138 serve the eastern part of the hydrographic side of Lac La Flippe.

Geography 
Located in a forest zone in the territory of Baie-Saint-Paul, La Flippe Lake is located on the western slope of the rivière du Gouffre valley and on the northwest bank of the Saint Lawrence River. Lac La Flippe turns out to be the head lake of Bras du Nord-Ouest. This body of water is bordered by marshes on the north and south banks. The mouth of this lake is located at:
  north-west of the place called "La Barrière" located along route 138;
  west of a mountain peak;
  south-west of the village center of Petite-Rivière-Saint-François;
  north-east of a curve of the Sainte-Anne River;
  south of the mouth of the Bras du Nord-Ouest (confluence with the Rivière du Gouffre), or in downtown Baie-Saint-Paul;
  west of the northwest shore of the St. Lawrence River.

Toponymy 
This toponymic designation appears on the draft of the Maillard map, 1959-05-21. A 1996 survey would date the use of this name to at least 1936. Toponymic variants: Lac Lavoie, Lac Laflippe and Lac la Flippe.

The toponym "Lac La Flippe" was formalized on December 5, 1968 at the Place Names Bank of the Commission de toponymie du Québec.

Related articles 

 Charlevoix Regional County Municipality
 Baie-Saint-Paul, an unorganized territory
 Bras du Nord-Ouest (Gouffre River tributary)
 Rivière du Gouffre

References 

Lakes of Capitale-Nationale
Charlevoix Regional County Municipality